Leo Clarke may refer to:

 Leo Clarke (VC) (1892–1916), Canadian recipient of the Victoria Cross
 Leo Clarke (bishop) (1923–2006), Australian bishop
 Leo Clarke (footballer) (1930–2007), Australian rules footballer 
 Leo Clarke (rugby league) (born 1978), Australian rugby league footballer